Mondor's disease is a rare condition which involves thrombophlebitis of the superficial veins of the breast and anterior chest wall. It sometimes occurs in the arm or penis. In axilla, this condition is known as axillary web syndrome.

Patients with this disease often have abrupt onset of superficial pain, with possible swelling and redness of a limited area of their anterior chest wall or breast. There is usually a lump present, which may be somewhat linear and tender. Because of the possibility of the lump being from another cause, patients are often referred for mammogram and/or breast ultrasound.

Mondor's disease is self-limiting and generally benign. A cause is often not identified, but when found includes trauma, surgery, or inflammation such as infection. There have been occasional cases of associated cancer. Management is with warm compresses and pain relievers, most commonly NSAIDS such as ibuprofen. When thrombophlebitis affects the greater veins, it can progress into the deep venous system, and may lead to pulmonary embolism.

The condition is named after Henri Mondor (1885–1962), a surgeon in Paris, France who first described the disease in 1939.

See also 
 Breast cancer

References

External links 

Vascular-related cutaneous conditions
Breast diseases